= Agonidus =

Former name for a genus of beetle

Agonidus was formerly the name of a genus of ground beetles in the family Carabidae with a single species, Agonidus cephalotes. The current status of this genus and species is considered invalid or doubtful.
